ATI released the Radeon X300 and X600 boards. These were based on the RV370 (110 nm process) and RV380 (130 nm Low-K process) GPU respectively. They were nearly identical to the chips used in Radeon 9550 and 9600, only differing in that they were native PCI Express offerings. These were very popular for Dell and other OEM companies to sell in various configurations; connectors: DVI vs. DMS-59, card height: full-height vs. half-height.

Later the Radeon X550 was launched, using the same chip as Radeon X300 graphics card (RV370).

Feature matrix

X300-X600 series
 All models include DirectX 9.0 and OpenGL 2.0
 All models use a PCI-E x16 interface

 1 Pixel shaders : Vertex shaders : Texture mapping units : Render output units

See also
 List of AMD graphics processing units
 Free and open-source device drivers: graphics#ATI.2FAMD

External links
 techPowerUp! GPU Database

ATI Technologies products
Graphics cards